Aadatha Aattamellam is a 2009 Tamil language drama film directed by A. B. Azhagar and produced by T. Radhakrishnan Kabilan. The film stars Ravi Ganesh, Bharathi and Jenny Jasmine, with Mansoor Ali Khan, T. P. Gajendran, Rishi and Srinath playing supporting roles. It was released after on 27 March 2009, after three years of production delays. The film marked the debut of Meera Jasmine's sister Jenny Jasmine in Tamil cinema.

Plot

The film begins with Ashok (Ravi Ganesh) being urgently transported to the hospital by his sister Sudha (Jenny Jasmine) and his brother-in-law Kannan (Rishi).

Sudha and Ashok are orphan siblings. When their parents committed suicide due to debts, Sudha had to support her little brother; so she had to raise him like a mother. In addition to working hard at school, Sudha worked in a petrol station. As the years passed by, Sudha became a bank receptionist and Ashok grew to become a basketball player. Ashok and his college mate Divya (Bharathi) fell in love with each other. First reluctant, Sudha accepted to marry Kannan, a marketing manager. What matters the most to Sudha was her brother, so she imposed one condition to Kannan: that her brother lives with them after the marriage. They eventually married, but married life was not as she expected as the in-laws refused her condition. Ashok was then forced to live in his college hostel, where he became a drug addict. Ashok could neither perform well in basketball games nor focus on studies and was eventually suspended from his college. So Sudha took him to her home, but the situation had only worsened as his addiction hurt his entourage. Ashok was then rejected by his friends, his girlfriend, and even his sister. During an argument with his sister and his brother-in-law, Ashok accidentally fell off a building.

Back to the present, Ashok dies in the hospital bed in front of his helpless sister Sudha.

Cast

Ravi Ganesh as Ashok
Bharathi as Divya
Jenny Jasmine as Sudha
Mansoor Ali Khan as Police Inspector
T. P. Gajendran as Professor
Rishi as Kannan
Srinath as Ashok's friend
Scissor Manohar as Ganesan, Dhandayuthapani and Balasubramaniam
Guhan Shanmugam as Ashok's friend
Manikandan as Ashok's friend
Srinivas as Ashok's friend
Siddharth as Ashok's friend
Sadhana as Kannan's mother
Usha Elizabeth
Shankar
Mime Gopi (uncredited role)

Soundtrack

The film score and the soundtrack were composed by A. R. Reihana. The soundtrack, released in 2006, features 5 tracks. The audio was launched alongside director K. Balachander, V. Z. Durai, Gana Ulaganathan, Chintamani Murugesan, Bharathi and Jenny Jasmine.

Reception
Behindwoods.com wrote, "The movie’s story talks about the ill-effects of doing drugs, but sadly the effort falls flat — courtesy the slipshod direction, camera, editing and the sorry performances of actors" and concluded with, "Save yourself, from drugs and the movie".

References

2009 films
2000s Tamil-language films
Indian drama films
Films about heroin addiction
2009 directorial debut films
Films scored by A. R. Reihana
2009 drama films